Barlow railway station was a railway station that served the village of Barlow in North Yorkshire, England from 1912 to 1964 via the Selby to Goole line. The area is now known as the site of Barlow Common Nature Reserve.

History

Construction of the Selby to Goole line began in 1907 and it was decided that one of the intermediate stations would be placed at Barlow. The line opened for freight traffic in December 1910, and the station opened to passengers in May 1912.

The station enabled the construction of an airship production factory in Barlow and later an ordnance depot, both of which used a branch from the station.

The station closed to passengers in June 1964 and was later completely demolished. Although much of Selby to Goole line was dismantled, the track from Brayton junction to the munitions depot in Barlow remained opened. The branch to the depot was later extended  in October 1966 to provide connection to Drax Power Station when it was being built.

Barlow ordnance depot closed in 1981, and the branch of line to the site was dismantled. By 1983, much of the line from the Brayton junction was also dismantled.

Barlow Common

Before the site was purchased by the NER company, Barlow Common was used as an area for pasturing livestock.

In the 1940s, the area beside the station began to be used as a railway refuse and ballast tip, however this ceased in 1983 after asbestos was discovered. British Rail later reclaimed the land and covered the ground with soil.

In 1986, Selby District Council acquired the land and converted it into a nature reserve. It has since seen the return of many species of flora and fauna. It was declared a local nature reserve in March 2002.

Barlow Common is also used as a scout campsite.

References

External links
 Station on navigable O.S. map

Disused railway stations in North Yorkshire
Former North Eastern Railway (UK) stations
Railway stations in Great Britain opened in 1912
Railway stations in Great Britain closed in 1964
1912 establishments in England
1964 disestablishments in England
Beeching closures in England